The 2011–12 season was Sloboda Point Sevojno's first season in the Serbian SuperLiga, after Sevojno finished 2nd in the Serbian First League. In the summer of 2010 Sloboda Užice and FK Sevojno merged, forming the club Sloboda Point Sevojno. Because of the reconstruction of the Užice City Stadium, Sloboda played their first season in SuperLiga on Mladost Lučani Stadium.

Transfers

In

Out

Fixtures

Round

Results and positions by round

Serbian SuperLiga

Pld = Matches played; W = Matches won; D = Matches drawn; L = Matches lost; GF = Goals for; GA = Goals against; GD = Goal difference; Pts = Points

Serbian Cup

Round

Squad statistics

References

External links
 Serbian SuperLiga official website

FK Sloboda Užice
Sloboda Point Sevojno